Pleea is a small genus of flowering plants described as a genus in 1803. There is only one known species, Pleea tenuifolia, the rush featherling, native to the southeastern United States (Florida, Alabama, North Carolina, and South Carolina).

References

Tofieldiaceae
Flora of the Southeastern United States
Monotypic Alismatales genera
Taxa named by André Michaux